Bärenburg is a village near to Andeer in Switzerland.

References 

Andeer
Villages in Graubünden